Country Club is a census-designated place and a suburban unincorporated community located in northwest Miami-Dade County, Florida, United States. It is named after the Country Club of Miami, which was established in 1961 in what was then an unpopulated and undeveloped section of the county. The population was 49,967 at the 2020 census, up from 3,408 in 1990.

Geography
Its northern border is the Broward County line. It is bordered by the town of Miami Lakes to the south, unincorporated Palm Springs North to the west, and the city of Miramar to the north.

Florida State Road 826, the Palmetto Expressway, runs along the southern edge of the community, leading east  to Florida's Turnpike and Interstate 95, and south  to U.S. Route 1 at Pinecrest.

Demographics

2020 census

As of the 2020 United States census, there were 49,967 people, 16,710 households, and 12,228 families residing in the CDP.

2000 census
As of the census of 2000, there were 36,310 people, 12,917 households, and 9,338 families residing in the CDP. The racial makeup of the CDP was 63.54% White (15.5% were Non-Hispanic White,) 22.01% African American, 0.23% Native American, 2.21% Asian, 0.06% Pacific Islander, 7.25% from other races, and 4.70% from two or more races. Hispanic or Latino of any race were 60.32% of the population.

There were 12,917 households, out of which 41.3% had children under the age of 18 living with them, 48.3% were married couples living together, 18.2% had a female householder with no husband present, and 27.7% were non-families. 19.9% of all households were made up of individuals, and 2.5% had someone living alone who was 65 years of age or older.  The average household size was 2.80 and the average family size was 3.23.

In the region the population was spread out, with 27.2% under the age of 18, 10.8% from 18 to 24, 38.4% from 25 to 44, 17.5% from 45 to 64, and 6.2% who were 65 years of age or older.  The median age was 30 years. For every 100 females, there were 90.3 males.  For every 100 females age 18 and over, there were 85.1 males.

The median income for a household in the region was $56,272, and the median income for a family was $56,353. Males had a median income of $31,018 versus $24,901 for females. The per capita income for the CDP was $17,999.  About 10.9% of families and 13.1% of the population were below the poverty line, including 15.7% of those under age 18 and 15.6% of those age 65 or over.

As of 2000, speakers of Spanish as a first language accounted for 64.02% of residents, while English made up 30.74%, French Creole was at 2.20%, French was at 0.92%, and Brazilian Portuguese at 0.53% of the population.

Education
Miami-Dade County Public Schools serves Country Club.

American Senior High School 
Country Club Middle School
Joella C. Good Elementary School

In 2009 sections of Country Club were rezoned to Barbara Goleman High School in Miami Lakes.

Dade Christian School (K-12) is in Country Club.

Parks and recreation 
Country Village Park
Country Club Villas Park
Willis D. Harding Park
North Pointe Community Center
Country Village Park Skatepark

References

Unincorporated communities in Miami-Dade County, Florida
Census-designated places in Miami-Dade County, Florida
Census-designated places in Florida
Unincorporated communities in Florida
1961 establishments in Florida
Populated places established in 1961